The Nufenestock (2,866 m) is a mountain of the Lepontine Alps, located on the border between the Swiss cantons of Valais and Ticino. It lies between the Nufenen Pass and the Passo del Corno. On its south-west side it overlooks the lake of Gries.

References

External links
 Nufenenstock on Hikr

Mountains of the Alps
Mountains of Valais
Mountains of Ticino
Ticino–Valais border
Lepontine Alps
Mountains of Switzerland
Two-thousanders of Switzerland